This is a partial list of hillforts in the Peak District of England, arranged alphabetically. Most lie within the Peak District National Park. The sites are typically protected Scheduled Monuments.

See also 

 List of hillforts in England
 Scheduled monuments in Derbyshire

Further reading 

 The Hill-Forts of the Peak by F.L. Preston, pages 1-31 Derbyshire Archaeological Journal (1954), Volume 74

References 

Hillforts_in_the_Peak_District
Hillforts_in_the_Peak_District
Hillforts_in_the_Peak_District